Münchsteinach is a municipality in the district of Neustadt (Aisch)-Bad Windsheim in Middle Franconia, Bavaria, Germany.

References

Neustadt (Aisch)-Bad Windsheim